South Dayi may refer to:

South Dayi District, district of Ghana in the Volta Region
South Dayi (Ghana parliament constituency), one of the constituencies represented in the Parliament of Ghana